Hymenoxys (rubberweed or bitterweed) is a genus of plants in the sunflower family, native to North and South America. It was named by Alexandre Henri Gabriel de Cassini in 1828.

Plants of this genus are toxic to sheep due to the presence of the sesquiterpene lactone hymenoxon.

 Species
 Hymenoxys ambigens - Pinaleno Mountain rubberweed - Arizona New Mexico 
 Hymenoxys anthemoides - Rio Grande do Sul, Rio de Janeiro, Paraguay, Uruguay, Argentina 
 Hymenoxys biennis - Utah 
 Hymenoxys bigelovii - Utah Arizona New Mexico 
 Hymenoxys brachyactis - East View rubberweed - New Mexico 
 Hymenoxys brandegeei - Arizona New Mexico Colorado 
 Hymenoxys cabrerae - Argentina 
 Hymenoxys californica - California, Baja California 
 Hymenoxys chrysanthemoides - San Luis Potosí, Veracruz, Zacatecas, México State, Puebla, Oaxaca, Hidalgo 
 Hymenoxys cooperi - Cooper's rubberweed - California Nevada  Arizona Utah Idaho Oregon New Mexico 
 Hymenoxys grandiflora - New Mexico Colorado Wyoming Montana Utah Idaho 
 Hymenoxys helenioides - intermountain rubberweed - Arizona New Mexico Colorado Utah 
 Hymenoxys hoopesii - owl claws - New Mexico Colorado Wyoming Montana Utah Idaho Oregon Nevada  California 
 Hymenoxys insignis - 	Nuevo León, Coahuila, Chihuahua 
 Hymenoxys jamesii - Arizona 
 Hymenoxys lemmonii - Lemmon's rubberweed - Arizona Oregon Nevada California 
 Hymenoxys multiflora - Texas New Mexico 
 Hymenoxys mutica - California 
 Hymenoxys odorata - bitter rubberweed - California Arizona New Mexico Texas Oklahoma Colorado Kansas Maine South Carolina Alabama, Baja California, Baja California Sur,  Sonora, Chihuahua, Coahuila, Durango, Nuevo León, San Luis Potosí, Tamaulipas 
 Hymenoxys quinquesquamata - rincon rubberweed - Arizona New Mexico 
 Hymenoxys richardsonii - pingue rubberweed, Colorado rubberweed - Alberta, Saskatchewan, Montana Idaho Wyoming Utah Colorado New Mexico Arizona Texas Nebraska North Dakota Nevada  
 Hymenoxys robusta - Bolivia, Argentina, Peru 
 Hymenoxys rusbyi - Arizona New Mexico 
 Hymenoxys subintegra - Arizona rubberweed -  Arizona Utah 
 Hymenoxys texana - prairie dawn - Texas
 Hymenoxys tweediei - Argentina 
 Hymenoxys vaseyi  - Texas New Mexico

 formerly included

References

External links
 Jepson Manual Treatment, University of California
 United States Department of Agriculture Plants Profile

 
Asteraceae genera